Sunshine Coast Airport (formerly Maroochydore Airport)  is an Australian international airport located in Marcoola,  north of Maroochydore, at the northern end of the Sunshine Coast. The airport is owned by Sunshine Coast Regional Council and is the principal and only jet-capable airport serving an urban area of over 350,000 residents.

The airport serves as a gateway to holiday destinations such as Noosa, Maroochydore, Mooloolaba, and Caloundra. There are direct flights to Adelaide, Canberra, Melbourne, Sydney and regional destinations throughout Queensland, New South Wales and Victoria. In addition, Air New Zealand provide international service, with three weekly return flights to Auckland. The airport also supports a variety of tourism, flight training and general aviation activities. 

Sunshine Coast Airport was the 12th busiest airport in Australia and fifth busiest in Queensland during the 2012–22 financial year, handling 816,873 passengers. Like most Australian airports, MCY was impacted by travel restrictions in response to the COVID-19 pandemic that saw passenger numbers decline from a peak of 1,257,561 in 2018–19.

History
The Queensland Government granted a parcel of land to the Maroochy Shire Council in 1958 for use as a general aviation airstrip. The first test landing on a grass strip was on 16 August 1959. The airstrip was initially used by the Maroochy Aero Club and Queensland Parachute Club. Maroochy Shire Council funded the construction of a  sealed runway, suitable for Fokker F27 Friendship aircraft, which opened on 12 August 1961. With the commencement of regular public transport services, the airstrip was renamed Maroochydore Airport. Lights for night landings were provided in 1974. 

A terminal building was constructed in 1979. The runway was upgraded again in 1993 to allow the operation of larger Boeing 737 and Airbus A320 jets. A new terminal building was completed in 1997 and the airport was renamed Maroochydore-Sunshine Coast Airport. 

By 2009, the airport handled 916,845 annual passengers, making it the 15th busiest airport in Australia. On 3 June 2010, the airport changed its name from "Maroochydore-Sunshine Coast Airport" to "Sunshine Coast Airport" and changed its ICAO code from YBMC to YBSU. The airport handled approximately 87,000 aircraft movements in 2012 and was nearing or exceeding its capacity of 900,000 annual passengers in consecutive years .

International flights and growth
In February 2012, Air New Zealand announced plans to launch a new twice-weekly service between Auckland and Sunshine Coast Airport, to operate seasonally from July to September, the first time scheduled International flights had operated from Sunshine Coast Airport. Customs, immigration and quarantine facilities were added to the terminal ahead of the first flight. On 12 November, Air New Zealand announced that the season would be extended in 2013, with flights operating from June to October. Air New Zealand later committed to operating the services until at least 2017. 

2016 saw domestic airlines Jetstar, QantasLink and Virgin Australia significantly increase their capacity through Sunshine Coast Airport, adding more than 65,000 extra seats. 24,200 more seats were added between Sydney and Sunshine Coast, 16,920 extra on the Melbourne to Sunshine Coast route, while Jetstar introduced direct flights to Adelaide, providing 23,400 seats on the new route. A total of 244,708 passengers arrived or departed from Sunshine Coast Airport during the summer season from December 2015 and February 2016.

On 9 February 2017, Sunshine Coast Regional Council mayor Mark Jamieson announced that Palisade Investment Partners had been awarded a 99-year lease to operate the airport, with the lease running until 2116.

Expansion and reconfiguration
To address capacity issues at the airport, John Holland Group were contracted to undertake a major upgrade and expansion project in 2018. As part of the construction, the existing  runway 18/36, which handled all commercial jet traffic was decommissioned and converted to a taxiway. Its replacement was a new  NW-SE runway (Runway 13/31). To allow for this, the  general aviation runway (12/30) was also removed. The scope of these works were controversial amongst airport tenants and communities that would be overflown by the new flight paths, becoming the subject of numerous legal challenges.

A series of environmental considerations were given to the expansion, including the Coordinator-General's recommendation to ensure the requirements for tidal flap to allow conveyance of floodwater and avoid submergence of mangrove roots for extended periods. Other requirement such as offsetting to provide additional critical habitat for vulnerable flora and fauna including revegetation of sections to provide adequate and alternate suitable wildlife corridors for species. 

On 14 June 2020, the new runway (13/31) was opened, allowing operation of larger wide body aircraft such as Airbus A330 and Boeing 777, Boeing 787 with longer range capable of direct flights to Southeast Asia, China and Hawaii, with minimal impact on nearby residents. Use of wide body aircraft such as Airbus A330 and Boeing 777, Boeing 787 would allow for direct flights to Southeast Asia, China and Hawaii, This upgrade also allowed for more domestic flights, typically using Boeing 737 and Airbus A320 airliners, to operate with greater payloads.

During 2019, Air New Zealand had already extended seasonal flights to Auckland from 2020 through to 2023 with the backing of the Queensland Government, operating from April to October Following completion of the airport's expansion, on 25 June 2021 a further agreement was announced that secured year-round flights on the route.

In February 2022, low-cost carrier Bonza announced that the airport would become its headquarters and one of two main bases for its planned start-up operation.

Terminal and facilities
The airport has a single terminal, which can be split into separate international and domestic areas to accommodate Air New Zealand's Auckland flights. The single-storey building has no aerobridges; passengers must take a short walk across the tarmac to reach their aircraft.

There are no airline lounges within the terminal, however the public departure lounge provides seating available for about 300 people. Free WiFi is available throughout the building and there are several food and shopping outlets. Each of the three airlines operating have dedicated check-in desks and gates. There are two baggage carousels, TV monitors, a taxi rank, shuttle bus services and hire-car desks.

Statistics

Airlines and destinations

Operations

Ground transport
The airport is served by local taxi service Suncoast Cabs and by Sunbus' route 622 Sunshine Plaza to Noosa Junction.

Airport shuttle services are run by several companies offering transfer to Sunshine Coast hotels and private residences. They connect to all suburbs south of the Sunshine Coast Airport including Twin Waters, Maroochydore, Alexandra Headland, Mooloolaba, Kawana, Buderim, Caloundra, Golden Beach and Pelican Waters.

See also
Caloundra Airport
List of airports in Queensland

References

External links

Airports established in 1959
Airports in Queensland
Public transport in Sunshine Coast, Queensland
1959 establishments in Australia
International airports in Australia